Sabu Cyril is an Indian film production designer. Having worked in 116 feature films and 2500 ad films. He has won four National Film Award for Best Production Design, four state awards, six Filmfare Award for Best Art Direction (including south), five International Indian Film Academy Awards, and many other awards. His work in Enthiran won him international recognition. Over the years, he has emerged to be the most celebrated art director in the country.

Early life and education
Known as Sabu Cyril today, he was born Sebastian Vincent Cyril in the hill station of Valparai(Coimbatore District, Tamil Nadu), and completed his schooling in Asan Memorial (Chennai). He graduated from the Government College of Fine Arts, Chennai (formerly Government School of Arts and Crafts, Chennai).It was his grandfather George Vincent who first called him 'Sabu'.
George Vincent was known for opening the first photography studio in Malabar, Kozhikode, called Chitra Studio. His son (Sabu’s uncle), Mr. A. Vincent was a reputed cinematographer and director in the South Indian Film Industry.
It was probably his proximity to nature, wildlife and cinema that subconsciously helped Sabu develop an affinity to the world of aesthetics and design. 
Ever since he was a child, Sabu was always interested in knowing how things work and how this can be applied in everyday life. This curiosity drew him to the world of physics and chemistry, which helped him develop a scientific and practical outlook to problem-solving.
Sabu started his career as a graphic designer and illustrator. It was only as a favour to a friend that he entered a film set. 
Circumstance and chance made Sabu an Art Director on his first ever film. Sabu believes that he could rise to the challenge because of his inclination towards science and art, it may seem as if he was destined to be a Production Designer all along.

Career
From 1982 to 1988, he was a freelance graphics designer for companies such as Welcomgroup Hotels, the Taj Group of Hotels, and Madura Coats. In 1988, he began his art director career, and has directed more than 2,500 advertisements, 3 teleserials and 115 feature films in Malayalam, Hindi, Tamil, Telugu and Kannada and designed several stage shows. In 1996, he directed the stage design for the Miss World beauty pageant. He also worked as one of the 2nd unit Art Directors in the 1990 film Iyer the Great.

Filmography

As Actor

Tamil
 Vikram (1986)
 Enthiran (2010)

As Art Director

Malayalam
 Iyer the Great (1990)
 Amaram (1991)
 Uncle Bun (1991)
 Adwaytham (1991)
 Mahanagaram (1992)
 Dhruvam (1993)
 Minnaram (1994)
 Thenmavin Kombath (1994)
 Pavithram (1994)
 Sainyam (1994)
 Maanthrikam (1995)
 Kaalapani (1996)
 Chandralekha (1997)
 Kannezhuthi Pottum Thottu (1999)
 Megham (1999)
 Raakilipattu (2000)
 Kakkakuyil (2001)
 Kilichundan Mampazham (2003)
 Magic Magic 3D (2003)
 Aakasha Gopuram (2008)
 Oru Marubhoomikkadha (2011)
 Kolaambi (2019)
 Marakkar: Lion of the Arabian Sea (2021)

Hindi
 Muskurahat (1992)
 Gardish (1993)
 Virasat (1997)
 Saat Rang Ke Sapne (1998)
 Kabhi Na Kabhi (1998)
 Doli Saja Ke Rakhna (1998)
 Major Saab (1998)
 Pukar (2000)
 Hey Ram (2000)
 Hera Pheri (2000)
 Raja Ko Rani Se Pyar Ho Gaya (2000)
 Aśoka (2001)
 Bas Itna Sa Khwaab Hai (2001)
 Yeh Teraa Ghar Yeh Meraa Ghar (2001)
 Om Jai Jagadish (2002)
 Hungama (2003)
 Khushi (2003)
 Main Hoon Na (2003)
 Yuva (2004)
 Hulchul (2004)
 Phir Milenge
 Kuchh Meetha Ho Jaye (2005)
 Garam Masala (2005)
 Kyon Ki (2005)
 Chup Chup Ke (2005)
 Malamaal Weekly (2006)
 Jaan-E-Mann (2006)
 Bhagam Bhag (2006)
 Welcome (2007)
 Dhol (2007)
 Guru (2007)
 Bhool Bhulaiyaa (2007)
 Om Shanti Om (2007)
 Mere Baap Pehle Aap (2008)
 Aladin (2009)
 De Dana Dan (2009)
 Billu (2009)
 Khatta Meetha (2010)
 Bumm Bumm Bole (2010)
 Aakrosh (2010)
 Tees Maar Khan (2010)
 Ra.One (2011)
 Tezz (2012)
 Kamaal Dhamaal Malamaal (2012)
 Son of Sardaar (2012)
 Rangrezz (2013)
 Himmatwala (2013)
 Run Bhola Run (2013)
 Krrish 3 (2013)
 Final Cut of Director (2016)
 Shivaay (2016)
 Saaho (2019)

Tamil
 Kalaignan (1993)
 Pudhiya Mugam (1993)
 Paasamalargal (1994)
 Kannathil Muthamittal (2001)
 Citizen (2001)
 Thamizhan (2002)
 Panchathantiram (2002)
 Iyarkai (2003)
 Boys (2003)
 Lesa Lesa (2003)
 Ayutha Ezhuthu (2004)
 Anniyan (2005)
 Kanchivaram (2008)
 Enthiran (2010) (also cameo appearance as Shah, Mr.Bohra's agent/translator)
 Yaan (2013)
 Lingaa (2014)
 Sometimes (2016)

Telugu
 Gandeevam (1994)
 Devi Putrudu (2001)
 Baahubali: The Beginning (2015)
 Baahubali 2: The Conclusion (2017)
 Saaho (2019)
 RRR (2022)
 NTR 30 (upcoming)

Kannada
 Cheluvi (1992)
 Chinna (1994)

Awards

National Film Awards

1994 – Best Production Designer – Thenmavin Kombath (Malayalam)
1995 – Best Production Designer – Kaalapani (Malayalam)
2007 – Best Production Designer – Om Shanti Om (Hindi)
2010 – Best Production Designer – Enthiran (Tamil)

Nandi Awards

2015 - Nandi Award for Best Art Director - Baahubali

Kerala State Film Awards
1994 – Best Art Director – Thenmavin Kombath
1995 – Best Art Director – Kaalapani

Tamil Nadu State Film Awards
2002 – Best Art Director – Kannathil Muthamittal

Filmfare Awards
1994 – Best Art Direction – Gardish
2000 – Best Art Direction – Hey Ram
2005 – Best Art Direction – Yuva

Filmfare Awards South
2005 – Best Art Director – Anniyan
2010 – Best Art Director – Enthiran
2017 - Best Art Director - Baahubali: The Conclusion

Vijay Awards
2014 – Vijay Award for Best Art Director – Lingaa

International Indian Film Academy Awards
2007 – Best Art Direction – Om Shanti Om
2009 – Best Art Direction – Aladin
2010 – Best Art Direction – Enthiran
2011 – Best Art Direction – Ra.One
2015 - Best Art Direction – Baahubali

South Indian International Movie Awards
2012 – Generation Next Award (Sensational Art Director)

Global Indian Film Awards
2004 – Best Art Director – Main Hoon Na

Kerala Film Critics Association Awards
1994 – Best Art Director – Thenmavin Kombath

International Tamil Film Awards
2003 – Best Art Director – Boys

Asianet Film Awards
1999 – Best Art Director – Kannezhuthi Pottum Thottu, Megham

Kerala Film Journals' Awards
1991 – Best Art Director – Adwaytham

Kerala Janakiya Awards
1995 – Best Art Director – Maanthrikam

Kaumudi Awards
1994 – Best Art Director – Thenmavin Kombath

Other awards
1985 – Best Outgoing Student (University of Madras) award by Government of Tamil Nadu
Kalavedi Award (Madras) – In recognition of commendable service to the cause of fostering human integration.
People of Arts Centre (Bombay) – In appreciation of Sazaa-E-Kaala Paani

References

External links 
 
 

Indian art directors
Malayali people
Living people
Kerala State Film Award winners
Filmfare Awards winners
Filmfare Awards South winners
Government College of Fine Arts, Chennai alumni
1962 births
Indian production designers
Tamil Nadu State Film Awards winners
20th-century Indian designers
Film people from Kerala
21st-century Indian designers
Best Production Design National Film Award winners